Ebony Fashion Fair (also known as the Ebony Traveling Fashion Fair) was an annual fashion event created by Eunice Johnson, co–founder of the Chicago, Illinois–based Johnson Publishing Company. The show ran across the United States and other countries from 1958 until 2009. In addition to the fashion fair, the company also created a cosmetic line named Fashion Fair Cosmetics, in 1973.  As of 2017, Fashion Fair Cosmetics are still available for purchase.

History
In 1956, John H. Johnson, founder of the Johnson Publishing Company, was approached by Jessie Dent (the wife of the president of Dillard University), who asked Johnson to supply models for a charity fundraiser benefiting the Flint-Goodridge Hospital located on Dillard University's New Orleans campus. Reluctant to use the models featured in the magazines published by his company, Johnson instead offered to provide the clothing.  Johnson and Dent then came to an agreement: Johnson Publishing Company would supply the garments for the fundraiser, and, each ticket to enter the show would include a subscription to either Ebony or Jet Magazine—both published by Johnson's company.

The Ebony Fashion Fair was launched in 1958 by the Johnson Publishing company and repeated annually for five decades under Eunice Walker Johnson; the director and producer of the show.  The Ebony Fashion Fair (also known as the Ebony Travelling Fashion Fair), traveled to 30 cities over its 51-year run providing exclusive fashion to “hundreds of thousands attendees across the United States, Canada and the Caribbean” (Bivins.11). The show was held in 187 venues with audiences as large as 5,000 attendees.  The Ebony Fashion Fair not only helped to boost the Johnson Publishing Company's brand identity, it also raised $55 million in funds for African American charities.  The show featured male and female models of mostly African-American descent modeling fashions from top European designers such as: Yves St Laurent, Oscar de la Renta, Pierre Cardin, Paco Rabanne, Givenchy, Jean Paul Gaultier, Valentino, and Emanuel Ungaro. The Fashion Fair held its last show in 2009, due to Eunice Walkers' death in January, 2010.

Fashion Fair Cosmetics
When Eunice Johnson noticed that the models at the Ebony Fashion Fair "were mixing foundations to create the right blend to match their hues", she initially approached existing cosmetics companies and asked them to develop make-up lines which would suit the specific needs of women of color. However, as she was met with resistance from the companies she approached, she and her husband, John H. Johnson, created the Capsule Collection: a small make-up compact in a mail-order package. Due to high-demand, the product led to the creation of a full cosmetic line named Fashion Fair Cosmetics, after the fashion show in 1973. According to Fortune, Fashion Fair Cosmetics was once the largest black-owned cosmetics company in the world. In April 2019, a United Kingdom creditor petitioned a judge to force the company to sell its Fashion Fair Cosmetics UK assets. In November 2019, the brand was acquired by Cheryl Mayberry McKissack and Desirée Rogers.

Legacy
From March 2013 thru May 2014, the Chicago History Museum displayed an exhibition titled Inspiring Beauty: 50 Years Of Ebony Fashion Fair.  The exhibition featured several ensembles featured in Fashion Fair shows during its half-century history.  The exhibition traveled nationally beginning in fall 2014, with stops including the Museum of Design Atlanta and the Milwaukee Art Museum.

References

See also
Fashion Fair
Gallery Int Fashion Fair

Fashion events in the United States
Recurring events established in 1958
Annual events in the United States